is a Japanese basketball player. She competed in the women's tournament at the 1976 Summer Olympics.

References

1953 births
Living people
Japanese women's basketball players
Olympic basketball players of Japan
Basketball players at the 1976 Summer Olympics
Sportspeople from Chiba Prefecture
Asian Games medalists in basketball
Asian Games gold medalists for Japan
Basketball players at the 1974 Asian Games
Medalists at the 1974 Asian Games